Abano Calcio is an Italian football club based in Abano Terme, Veneto. Currently it plays in Italy's Serie D.

History

Foundation
The club was founded in 1950.

Serie D
The team has played in Serie D from 1977 to 1984 and was promoted again in the season 2013–14.

Colors and badge
The team's colors are black and green.

External links
Official homepage

Football clubs in Italy
Football clubs in Veneto